Radio Tircoed 106.5FM is a community radio station serving Tircoed, Penllergaer, Pontardulais, Gorseinon, Pontlliw and surrounding areas in the north west of the City and County of Swansea, Wales.

The station, which broadcasts from studios at the Tircoed Village Hall, was founded in 2005 as a Restricted Service License (RSL) station, transmitting on 87.7FM during certain times of the year, usually in June or July (the run up to the Tircoed summer fete) and during the Christmas and New Year holidays.

Programming output varies throughout the day with various music-led, talk and feature programmes alongside specialist output in the evenings and at weekends, sports coverage and weekly bilingual programmes in Welsh/English. The majority of the station's output is locally produced and presented, although some late-night programming is syndicated.

Radio Tircoed is run by its own Management Team who are responsible for the day-to-day operation of the station.

Station Managers - Lee Giffard, Kevin Regan, Programme Controller - Shaun Broadley

Station Director - Mike Lewis, Deputy - Chris Hancock, Secretary - Paul Phillips a.k.a "Happy Jack"

References

External links
Official website

Radio stations in Wales
Mass media and culture in Swansea
Community radio stations in the United Kingdom